Croatia–Mexico relations are the bilateral relations between Croatia and Mexico. Both countries are mutual members of the United Nations. Neither country has a resident ambassador.

History
In 1918, Croatia joined SFR Yugoslavia after the dissolution of the Austro-Hungarian Empire. Mexico and Yugoslavia established diplomatic relations on 24 May 1946. Following Croatia's independence from Yugoslavia in June 1991 and Mexico recognized the new independent nation on 22 May 1992. Diplomatic relations between Croatia and Mexico were officially established on 6 December 1992. In April 1997, Croatian Vice Foreign Minister Frane Krinc paid a visit to Mexico while on trip to various Latin American nations.

In March 2002, Croatian President Stjepan Mesić paid a visit to Mexico to attend the International Conference on Financing for Development in Monterrey. This was the first and highest level visit paid to Mexico by a Croatian head-of-state. In May 2002, a Mexican Senatorial delegation, led by Senator César Jáuregui Robles, participated at the Conference of Presidents of the Parliaments of the members and observers of the Council of Europe, held in Zagreb.

In October 2008, Mexican Secretary of Foreign Affairs Patricia Espinosa paid an official visit to Croatia, which was the first visit at a ministerial level by a Mexican official to Croatia since the establishment of diplomatic relations. While in Croatia, Foreign Minister Espinosa met with Croatian President Stpejan Mesić and Prime Minister Ivo Sanader. 

In October 2010, both nations held the First Meeting of the Political Consultation Mechanism between the Foreign Ministries of Mexico and Croatia held in Mexico City and attended by Croatian Deputy Foreign Minister Davor Božinović.

In 2022, both nations celebrated 30 years of diplomatic relations.

High-level visits
High-level visits from Croatia to Mexico

 Foreign Vice Minister Frane Krinc (1997)
 President Stjepan Mesić (2002)
 Deputy Foreign Minister Davor Božinović (2010)

High-level visit from Mexico to Croatia
 Senator César Jáuregui Robles (2002)
 Foreign Minister Patricia Espinosa (2008)

Bilateral agreements
Both nations have signed a few bilateral agreements such as a Memorandum of Understanding for the Establishment of a Mechanism of Consultation in Matters of Mutual Interest (2008); Agreement on the Elimination of Visa Requirements for Diplomatic and Official Passport Holders (2008); Agreement on the Elimination on Visa Requirements for Ordinary Passport holders (2010); and an Agreement on Educational, Cultural and Sports Cooperation (2011).

Croats in Mexico
There is a small immigrant community of Croats in Mexico, mostly in the capital and its surroundings. Mexican cuisine, music (mariachi) and soap operas are popular in Croatia. Los Caballeros is the first Croatian band that performs traditional Mexican music. In 2000, it successfully participated in the 7th International Mariachi and Charreria meeting in Guadalajara.

Croatian sailor and soldier Vinko Paletin joined the expedition that was led by Francisco de Montejo on the Yucatán Peninsula. As a member of the Mexican Dominican Province of St. James, Paletin had been preparing to become a priest in a Mexican Monetary of St. Dominic. At the end of summer of 1546, he returned to Europe.

18th century Croatian Jesuit missionary Ferdinand Konščak ) had become one of the most famous researchers of Mexican peninsula Baja California, proving that it was a peninsula. Konščak was a distinguished mathematician, astronomer, naturalist, geologist, builder of roads and embankments and supervisor of all the Jesuit reductions in Mexico. A small Mexican island, Roca Consag, was named after him.

Croatian Jesuit priest Ivan Ratkaj came to present-day Mexican province of Chihuahua in 1680. He has written three very detailed reports about his trip, landscape, as well as about life, nature and customs of indigenous people. These are the oldest descriptions of this region. With his third travelogue, Ratkaj enclosed a map of the province marked with latitude and longitude, parts of the world, missionary stations and Spanish forts, habitats of provincial Indian tribes and rivers and mountains. It is also one of the first mapping works by Croatian authors, and the oldest map of that Mexican province. Map was made in 1683 as a drawing on paper. The original is kept in the Central Jesuit Archives in Rome. Small copy was published by EJ Burrus in La obra de la Provincia cartografico Mexicana de la Compañía de Jesús, 1567-1967, Madrid 1967, P. II. carta Nr. 16.

Economic cooperation
In 1997, Mexico signed a Free Trade Agreement with the European Union. In 2017, trade between Croatia and Mexico totaled US$44 million. In 2015 Croatia exported to Mexico goods worth $25.4 million and imported from it goods worth $20.6 million. Croatia's main exports to Mexico include: molding machines and apparatus, leather and varistors of metal oxides. Mexico's main exports to Croatia include: transport vehicles, machines and apparatus for wrapping merchandise and seat parts. Mexican multinational companies such as América Móvil and Cemex operate in Croatia.

Diplomatic missions
 Croatia is accredited to Mexico from its embassy in Washington, D.C., United States and maintains an honorary consulate in Mexico City.
 Mexico is accredited to Croatia from its embassy in Budapest, Hungary and maintains an honorary consulate in Zagreb.

See also
 Croatian Mexicans
 Foreign relations of Croatia
 Foreign relations of Mexico
 Mexico–Yugoslavia relations

References

 
Mexico
Bilateral relations of Mexico